The Central Coast is a peri-urban region in New South Wales, Australia, lying on the Tasman Sea coast to the north of Sydney and south of Newcastle.

The local government area of the Central Coast Council has an estimated population of 333,627 as of June 2018, growing by 1% annually. Comprising localities such as Gosford, Wyong and Terrigal, the area is the third-largest urban area in New South Wales and the ninth-largest urban area in Australia. Geographically, the Central Coast is generally considered to include the region bounded by the Hawkesbury River in the south, the Watagan Mountains in the west and the southern end of Lake Macquarie, lying on the Sydney basin.

Politically, the Central Coast Council has administered the area since 12 May 2016, when the Gosford City Council and the Wyong Shire Council merged. In September 2006, the New South Wales government released a revised long-term plan for the region that saw the Central Coast classified as an urban area, along with Wollongong and the Hunter Region. , Scot MacDonald served as the parliamentary secretary for the Hunter and Central Coast. In November 2015 both Gosford and Wyong councils controversially voted to merge following a NSW Independent Pricing and Regulatory Tribunal assessment which found the Gosford and Wyong Shire Councils did not meet the stand-alone operating criteria for the NSW State government's "Fit for the Future" plans for the Local Area Councils within the state.
Despite local opposition and concerns over Wyong Shire, in effect, being subsumed within the Gosford Council, and claims of councillors being bullied into the merger, as part of the process, amalgamation into a single Central Coast local government area passed all administrative and legislative requirements and came into effect in 2016. As of mid-2020, the amalgamation process had cost $49 million.
The newly amalgamated Central Coast Council held elections in September 2017.

History 
The region has been inhabited for thousands of years by Aboriginal people. The local Kuringgai people were the first Aboriginal people to come in contact with British settlers. An Aboriginal man from the region named Bungaree became one of the most prominent people of the early settlement of New South Wales. He was one of the first Aboriginal people to learn English and befriended the early governors Phillip, King and Macquarie. He accompanied explorer Matthew Flinders in circumnavigating Australia. Macquarie later declared Bungaree "The King of the Broken Bay Tribes".

In addition to Kuringgai-speaking people (referred to as the "Pittwater tribes" and "Broken Bay tribes" by early colonists), Awabakal lived around Lake Macquarie, and Darkinyung people lived inland, to the west of the Mooney Mooney Creek.  The Kuringgai (Guriŋgai), Awaba and Darkinyung languages are related to each other, but are distinct from the Dharrug and Sydney languages that were spoken south of the central coast. Post-settlement disease and disruption greatly reduced the numbers of Aboriginal people.

In 1811, the Governor of New South Wales, Lachlan Macquarie, gave the first land grant in the region to William Nash, a former marine of the First Fleet. No further grants were made in the area until 1821.

Geography

The region is a network of towns that have been linked in recent years by expanding suburban development. The main urban cluster of the region surrounds the northern shore of Brisbane Water and includes the Coast's largest population centre, Gosford, stretching east to the retail centre of Erina. Other major commercial "centres" on the Coast are Wyong, Tuggerah, Lakehaven, The Entrance, Terrigal, and Woy Woy. Large numbers of people who live in the southern part of the region commute daily to work in Sydney. The Central Coast is also a popular tourist destination and a popular area for retirement. The Central Coast has significant employment including services, tourism, manufacturing, finance, building, retail and industrial. As a result, the cultural identity of the region is distinct from that of the large and diverse metropolis of Sydney as well as from the Hunter region with its mining, heavy industry and port.
On 2 December 2005, the Central Coast was officially recognised as a stand-alone region rather than an extension of Greater Sydney or the Hunter Valley.

Climate
The Central Coast has a humid subtropical climate (Köppen climate classification: Cfa), with warm humid summers and mild winters. Rainfall is spread fairly evenly throughout the year, but is slightly more frequent during autumn. Winter is the driest time, with often minimal to no rain.

Population

The Australian Bureau of Statistics publishes population census data and regular population estimates on the Central Coast under a Significant Urban Area. As at June 2018 the estimated population of this region was 333,627, with population forecasts projecting it will grow by more than 20 per cent to 415,050 by 2035. Estimated resident population, 30 June 2018.Earlier, at the 2001 Census, the population was 304,753 with 146,926 males and 157,827 females. The median age was 41. The ABS also includes the Central Coast region population wholly within Greater Sydney which results in Greater Sydney's population being larger than that of Greater Melbourne, however the NSW government definition for the Central Coast region it has its own regional population definition.

Education
The Central Coast has a campus of the University of Newcastle located at Ourimbah.
There are three campuses of the Hunter Institute of TAFE located at Gosford, Wyong and Ourimbah along with multiple private colleges.
The Central Coast has a large number of primary and secondary school institutions.

Culture

Media
Television
The Central Coast has four broadcast translators across the region, located at Bouddi (between Killcare & MacMasters Beach), Gosford and Wyong (Forresters Beach), and Mount Sugarloaf (Newcastle). Due to the Central Coast being split between the Sydney (metro) and Northern NSW (regional) licence areas, these translators carry stations from both areas.

In total eight television stations service the Central Coast:
 ABC New South Wales (ABN)
 SBS New South Wales (SBS)
 Seven Sydney (ATN)
 Nine Sydney (TCN)
 10 Sydney (TEN)
 Seven Northern NSW (NEN) 
 Nine Northern NSW (NBN)
 10 Northern NSW (NRN) - Network 10 affiliate

Each station broadcasts a primary channel and several multichannels. Of the three main networks, NBN produces a bulletin containing regional, national and international news screening every night at 6:00pm on Channel 9. Both WIN Television and Prime7 produce short local updates to fulfill local content quotas. Foxtel is also available via satellite.

Radio
The Central Coast has a number of local radio stations. The three large commercial stations are Triple M 107.7, Star 104.5, Hit 101.3, all being part of national networks.

The ABC has an outreach station on 92.5 FM that operates a locally produced breakfast show from 6am to 9am weekdays, outside this it broadcasts Sydney programming from ABC 702 AM. The community radio station CoastFM 96.3 has a considerable following as does Radio Five-O-Plus 93.3. A 24-hour Country music station TodayCountry94one is based in Gosford and broadcasts online and in syndication across the country. It also has a Christian radio station rheema fm on 94.9fm. As at Jan 2021 The Central Coast has a locally based internet Radio Station https://www.centralcoastradio.com providing locals with a radio station being broadcast by local presenters from their place of business/home. Offering local business and musicians a broader reach for their target market. Corporate prospectus is available at  https://www.centralcoastradio.com/rates-offers

In most locations on the Central Coast, Sydney and Newcastle radio stations can be received at reasonable levels particularly on the AM band.

Print
The Central Coast is not serviced by its own daily print newspaper though has three thriving weekly local newspapers as well as a fortnightly paper and several popular monthly newsletters.

A series of locally owned local papers have grown in popularity over time.  Coast Community News services the Central Gosford region and the Coast Community Chronicle services the northern part of the region and the Pelican Post services the postcodes of 2256 and 2257. All are published by a local independent publishing house Central Coast Newspapers bucking the trend in declining newspaper sales. The Peninsula News run by a community association services the southern part of the region centred around the Woy Woy area with a fortnightly paper. In addition a popular monthly business publication Central Coast Business Review has been sold and published for over 20 years. Previously the major print publication of the region was the weekly Central Coast Express Advocate, published by News Limited's News Local, though that ceased printing in 2019. It is now purely a subscription-based online service.

Theatre
The area has three operating theatres. Laycock Street Theatre, located in North Gosford, has a proscenium arch configuration and seats 392 patrons. The venue also contains a multi-purpose space suitable for conferences, board meetings, annual general meetings, cabaret and small musical acts. The resident amateur theatre group, the Gosford Musical Society, currently contribute 5 shows a year.

The largest theatre on the Central Coast is The Art House, Wyong, which opened in May 2016 and replaced the old Wyong Memorial Hall which was used mainly by Wyong Musical Theatre Company and Wyong Drama Group. The Art House is a multipurpose venue with a 500-seat proscenium arch theatre with a 12m x 9m stage and automated fly tower as well as a 285m2 studio space with retractable tiered seating for 130 people and AV link to the main theatre. The Art House also features a 500m2 space suited to functions and events, as well as an exhibition wall ideal for visual art and photography displays. The opening of this venue saw a sudden growth in arts companies producing theatre in the region including Endless Night Theatre Company, Gosford Theatre Company, Nate Butler's Studio, Salt House Theatre Company, and the regions only youth theatre body, Jopuka Productions.

In late 2018, the Elderslee Foundation purchased a large building along the Tuggerah Strait close to Wyong which has subsequently been renovated and repurposed into a community facility, including office facilities, hot desks, training rooms, a commercial kitchen and art exhibition space for use by the community and the Red Tree Theatre, a small adaptable space for forums, seminars, concerts, theatre rehearsals and productions. The Red Tree Theatre features a 144-seat ranked auditorium equipped with professional standard lighting and sound.

The Peninsula Theatre at Woy Woy features a 122-seat raked auditorium, 49m2 stage area and professional standard staging, lighting and sound capabilities.

Sport

Central Coast Mariners represent the Central Coast in the A-League. The Mariners have been A-League premiers twice (2007-08 and 2011-12), and were A-League champions in 2013. The Mariners play out of Central Coast Stadium at Gosford, the largest stadium on the Central Coast with a capacity of 20,059.

The Wyong Roos currently play in the Intrust Super Premiership at Morry Breen Oval in Kanwal. They are the feeder team of the Sydney Roosters National Rugby League team, who have developed an agreement to play one regular season fixture per year at Central Coast Stadium for five years, starting in 2015. The South Sydney Rabbitohs also play regular games.

The Central Coast Rhinos played in the Australian Ice Hockey League from 2006 to 2008 and the Australian International Ice Hockey Cup from 2009 to 2012. They played out of Erina Ice Arena at Erina Fair, which is the Central Coast's only ice rink. The Erina Ice Arena has been closed since the 19th of August, 2019 for renovations and is looking to reopen on Saturday the 2nd of January, 2021.

Other teams include the Central Coast Crusaders - the elite senior basketball program of the Central Coast region and the Central Coast Centurions - the Central Coast's junior rugby league representative team who compete in the S.G. Ball Cup and the Harold Matthews Cup.

Several attempts have been made to have teams enter other national competitions. The most notable of these was the attempt to enter the Central Coast Bears as the 16th team into the NRL.  This attempt was financed by a consortium led by John Singleton, but the Gold Coast Titans were ultimately successful. The Northern Eagles, a merger of NRL clubs Manly-Warringah and North Sydney began their tenure playing half of their games at Gosford; however, within three years the team was solely playing back at Brookvale. South Sydney were also unsuccessfully approached to play out of Gosford, despite the few games that are played on the Central Coast attracting large crowds. The Central Coast Storm rugby league team play in a number of NSWRL lower grade competitions, and the Central Coast Waves rugby union team plays in the Shute Shield. The Central Coast Rays rugby union club who competed in the ill-fated Australian Rugby Championship's only season late in 2007, called Central Coast Stadium home.

The Central Coast has numerous sporting ovals, golf courses, skate parks, tennis courts and swimming pools that are open to the public and one target shooting facility. Attempts are underway to build a series of bicycle paths. A velodrome is also open to the public at West Gosford. National parks on the Central Coast have a large range of walking paths and mountain bike trails. Water sports like sailing, rowing and water skiing are popular activities on the Central Coast lakes. Attempts are being made to attract pro golf tournaments to Magenta Shores (a new resort north of The Entrance). In 2011, the frigate  was scuttled off North Avoca Beach as an artificial reef.

Infrastructure

Health
The Central Coast has two large public hospitals with Emergency departments. Gosford Hospital is the largest with 460 beds, Wyong Hospital is located at Hamlyn Terrace and has 274 beds. Additionally, there is a small public hospital in Woy Woy and a Health Care Centre at Long Jetty. The largest private hospital on the Central Coast is Gosford Private Hospital located at North Gosford. Brisbane Waters Private in Woy Woy, Tuggerah Lakes Private at Kanwal and Berkeley Vale Private are also major healthcare providers. The region has 21 aged care facilities. New South Wales Ambulance has seven ambulance stations on the Central Coast located at Bateau Bay, Doyalson, Ettalong, Point Clare, Terrigal, Toukley and Wyong.

Transport
The Central Coast is serviced by an extensive and burgeoning road system. A combination of bus and rail provide limited public transport options for locals. The region also has a number of taxis operated by Central Coast Taxis. Transport has been a constant issue for the region and has been cited as high a priority over the last 20 years in regional plans and priorities by local, state and federal government agencies, with incremental investments largely in road infrastructure.

Road
Sydney Newcastle Freeway

The main access to the Central Coast by road is by the  Sydney-Newcastle Freeway that carries the designation National Highway 1, known to most as the F3 Freeway. From January 2013 it is officially part of the M1 Pacific Motorway. The freeway provides the most important road link between Sydney, the Central Coast, Newcastle and the Hunter Region.
Since December 2009 the F3 freeway is three lanes in each direction for 43 kilometres between Wahroonga and the Kariong Interchange. There is a small 8 kilometre section from the Kariong interchange to Peats Ridge which is two lanes each way and the freeway is then three lanes in each direction between Peats Ridge and Tuggerah. From Tuggerah north to Beresfield the freeway is two lanes in each direction. The two lane section between Kariong and Peats Ridge, and a two lane section between Tuggerah and Doyalson interchange was widened to 3 lanes in each direction in 2020.

Central Coast Highway

The roads that link Kariong with Doyalson (Pacific Highway, Dane Drive, Masons Parade, York Street, George Street, The Entrance Road, Oakland Avenue, Coral Street, Wilfred Barrett Drive, Budgewoi Road and Scenic Road) became known as the Central Coast Highway from 9 August 2006.

The Central Coast's roads are maintained by both local councils as well as state roads by the NSW government; however, due to the relatively large geography maintenance issues often arise.

Rail

The western suburbs of the Central Coast are on the Main Northern railway line. The rail line is primarily used to provide mass transport for those that commute to Sydney and as such services are most frequent during peak commuter times (typically one hour before Sydney peak times in the morning and one hour after in the evening due to the distance). Gosford station is the central station on the line connecting with most bus services as well as taxis.

Central Coast stations on the line are (from south to north):
 Wondabyne
 Woy Woy
 Koolewong
 Tascott
 Point Clare
 Gosford
 Narara
 Niagara Park
 Lisarow
 Ourimbah
 Tuggerah
 Wyong
 Warnervale
 Wyee

Trains terminate at both Gosford and Wyong stations which are also utilised by long-distance services.

Bus
Bus services in the region are operated by Busways which has depots at Kincumber and Charmhaven, Red Bus Services and Coastal Liner. All companies serve their own individual areas covering almost all areas of the region and rarely overlapping.

Busways operates services using Lake Haven, Tuggerah, Erina Fair and Gosford as central points. In the south services cover as far south as Woy Woy, Umina, Ettalong and Pearl Beach/Patonga, and also stretch out to Kincumber, Erina, Avoca Beach and Terrigal in the east. Occasional services are conducted to Kariong, then to Mangrove Mountain in the west. Busways' northern services cover from Gosford and north to Tuggerah (through the Narara Valley and Ourimbah), then continue north to Wyong via Tuggerah, which in turn services the northern section of Lake Haven, Charmhaven, Gorokan, Toukley, Noraville, Budgewoi, Buff Point and San Remo. Further services also utilise routes including Blue Haven, Gwandalan, and as far north as Swansea and Charlestown in Lake Macquarie.

Red Bus Services operate services mainly between Wyong and The Entrance as well as The Entrance and Gosford, although some services do reach Ourimbah and Wyong Hospital at Kanwal. Its services also operate to West Gosford, Wyoming, Holgate, Matcham, Point Frederick and Springfield. Although most services operate to/from Wyong Hospital via Berkeley Vale and Westfield Tuggerah, one service (Route 29) operates from Bay Village to Wyong Hospital via The Entrance, Magenta Shores, Toukley, Gorokan and Lake Haven. Red Bus have around 25 buses that are suitable for wheelchairs.

Coastal Liner operate limited route bus services around Westfield Tuggerah, Wyong, Wyee, Hamlyn Terrace, Woongarrah, Warnervale, Dooralong and Jilliby. Routes 10 (Tuggerah-Wyee via Hue Hue Road and Wyong), 12 (Tuggerah-Jilliby via Dicksons and Mandalong Roads) and 13 (Tuggerah-Dooralong via Jilliby Road) all operate only on weekdays with limited services. Route 11 is the most popular service, linking Lake Haven with Warnervale via Hamlyn Terrace and Woongarah. This service on weekdays occasionally extends to Westfield Tuggerah and Wyong Station via Hue Hue Road.

Telecommunications

The Central Coast falls in the fixed phone 43xx xxxx region and is classified Regional 1 for billing with the exception of northern suburbs Gwandalan and Summerland Point, which fall in the fixed phone region for Newcastle and Lower Hunter 49xx xxxx. Fixed-line telephone service is universally available. 3G and 4G mobile services are available from Optus, Telstra and Vodafone, though numerous black spots exist due to the topography and remoteness of some parts of the region. Steps to improve coverage areas along the railway have been announced by the Federal Government

ADSL and good quality fixed-wireless broadband services are widely available; however, significant blackspots continue to exist. High speed ADSL2 is available at most exchanges through Telstra. Few other providers exist, leading to an expensive high speed broadband offering for the region. Many areas experience very slow and/or unreliable ADSL connections due to the age and quality of the infrastructure.

Fibre optic based broadband services are available in some areas serviced by the National Broadband Network NBN. These include Kincumber, Gosford, East Gosford, West Gosford, Springfield, Berkley Vale, Tumbi Umbi & Long Jetty. Customers in these areas have 50 retail broadband service providers to choose from. Connection to the network does not cost the customer anything, though customers are expected to sign a 12 - 18-month contract. Monthly charges range from $29.50/month.

In 2011 the region was selected as one of the early roll out regions for the National Broadband Network's fibre to the premise installation which will offer stable speeds of 100/40 Mbit/s down/up load respectively. Two Points Of Interconnect (POI) are located in the region at Gosford and Berkley Vale exchanges. The regional rollout will radiate out from these two super exchanges. Services in areas around the two POI are now available.
The rollout of the NBN to the remainder of the region is in question following a change of government in September 2013. Trials of fibre to the node technology are planned for Umina and Woy Woy.

Retail
The Central Coast is home to Erina Fair, the largest single level shopping centre in the Southern Hemisphere and the largest non-metropolitan shopping centre in Australia. It provides many of the area's amenities such as restaurants, cinema, fast food and shopping. Another large shopping centre exists to the north, Westfield Tuggerah.

Other smaller local shopping centres are located throughout the region, including at Woy Woy, Umina, Kincumber, Gosford, Wyoming, Bateau Bay and Lake Haven.

Notes

References

External links 
 Regional Development Australia Central Coast
 Central Coast Council
 Tourism Central Coast
 Central Coast Mariners

 
Regions of New South Wales